Großenbrode is a municipality in the district of Ostholstein, in Schleswig-Holstein, Germany. It is situated on the Baltic Sea coast, opposite Fehmarn, approx. 8 km (5 mi) east of Heiligenhafen. Until 1963 it had a ferry connection to Gedser in Denmark. After World War II there was no ferry connection from West Germany to Denmark - the ferry port Warnemünde (near Rostock) now being in the communist east. Großenbrode was chosen as the site for a temporary ferry connection for the 3 hour crossing to Gedser. After the Fehmarnsund bridge was built in 1963, the ferryport moved to Puttgarden on Fehmarn. Großenbrode is planned to be the site of a portal of the Fehmarn Sound Tunnel by 2028.

References

External links 

Ostholstein
Populated coastal places in Germany (Baltic Sea)